Xok (also, Khok) is a village and municipality in the Kangarli District of Nakhchivan, Azerbaijan. It is located in the near of the Nakhchivan-Sharur highway, 6 km in the north-east from the district center, on the Sharur plain. Its population is busy with grain-growing, fodder and animal husbandry. There are secondary school, club, library and a medical center in the village. It has a population of 5234 (2009)  .

Etymology
It is one of the earliest settlements of the Azerbaijani people. According to some researchers, the oykonim is related with the Turkic word of xok (khok) // xak (khak) which is used in meaning of the "meadow, pasture". Also could be assumed that the name originated from the Iranian word of the xak (land).

References 

Populated places in Kangarli District